Ma Ramamurthy (1918–1967) also known as Kannadada Veera Senani, was an Indian writer, journalist and Kannada activist. He is often considered as a commander of Kannada movement in 1960s. Ramamurthy is known for designing the red-and-yellow arishina-kumkuma (turmeric-vermilion) Kannada flag. Ramamurthy Nagar, a locality in East Bengaluru in Karnataka, was named after him. He was nicknamed 'Kannadada Veera Senani'. Ramamurthy led the Kannada movement from the front in the 1950s and 1960s under the leadership of A. N. Krishna Rao and others.

He was born on 11 March 1918 at Nanjangud in a Brahmin family. His father Veerakesari Seetharama Shastri was a noted freedom fighter and litterateur.

Commemoration 
A locality in Bangalore called Ramamurthy Nagar was named after him.

Notes

References 

1918 births
1967 deaths
Kannada people
Kannada-language writers
People from Karnataka